The 2021 Brabantse Pijl was the 61st edition of the Brabantse Pijl cycle race and was held on 14 April 2021. The race covered , starting in Leuven and finishing in Overijse.

The top two finishers of the two previous editions, last year's winner Julian Alaphilippe and 2019 winner Mathieu van der Poel were absent.

Teams 
Seventeen of the nineteen UCI WorldTeams and six UCI ProTeams made up the twenty-three teams that participated in the race. There were 112 finishers from the field of 158 riders.

UCI WorldTeams

 
  
  
  
  
  
  
  
  
 
 
  
  
  
  
  
  

UCI ProTeams

Result

References

2021
Brabantse Pijl
Brabantse Pijl
Brabantse Pijl
Brabantse Pijl